Leslie MacPhail (4 June 1952 – 3 April 2008) was a Belgian judoka. He competed in the men's heavyweight event at the 1972 Summer Olympics.

References

1952 births
2008 deaths
Belgian male judoka
Olympic judoka of Belgium
Judoka at the 1972 Summer Olympics
Sportspeople from Antwerp
20th-century Belgian people